'Deutsche Botschaftsschule Peking (DBP; "German Embassy School of Beijing") is a German international school in Chaoyang District, Beijing. It serves years 1–12.

The current building, with a capacity of over 330 pupils, opened in 2004.

References

External links

  Deutsche Botschaftsschule Peking
  "Deutsche Schule Peking eröffnet deutsch-chinesisches Begegnungsprojekt." China Radio International (CRI). 12 October 2010.

International schools in Beijing
Beijing
China–Germany relations
High schools in Beijing
Schools in Chaoyang District, Beijing